Olga Scartezzini-Pall (born 3 December 1947) is a former alpine skier from Austria. At the 1968 Winter Olympics of Grenoble she won the downhill event. In addition to the Olympic gold, Pall had two World Cup victories during her career, both in the downhill discipline.

Pall retired from competitions at the end of the 1969–70 season and later worked as a physiotherapist with the Austrian Olympic ski team at the 1980 and 1984 Olympics. Between 1990 and 2002 she acted as Vice-President of the Austrian Ski Federation and then became its Honorary President. Pall was selected as the Austrian Sportswoman of the Year in 1968, and in 1996 was awarded a gold medal for services to the country. She married Ernst Scartezzini, also an alpine skier and prominent skiing administrator.

References

External links 
 
 

1947 births
Alpine skiers at the 1968 Winter Olympics
Austrian female alpine skiers
Olympic alpine skiers of Austria
Olympic gold medalists for Austria
Living people
Olympic medalists in alpine skiing
FIS Alpine Ski World Cup champions
Medalists at the 1968 Winter Olympics
20th-century Austrian women
21st-century Austrian women